The first season of Degrassi: Next Class (previously known as Degrassi) premiered on January 4, 2016, in Canada and was released on January 15, 2016, internationally. It was the first season to air on Family in Canada and on Netflix internationally.

This season follows a group of high school sophomores and juniors from Degrassi Community School, a fictional school in Toronto, Ontario, and depicts some of the typical issues and challenges common to a teenager's life. This season will depict a new school year after the previous seniors, some of whom debuted during "The Next Generation", graduated in the previous season. This season will feature another rebranding for the series and is being considered a stand-alone series.

Synopsis

This series is a continuation of the first incarnation "Degrassi: Next Generation", as it picks up five months and follows the remaining underclassmen as they enter Sophomore and Junior year at Degrassi community school. This series dives into serious and dark topic that affect the new generation of viewers watching otherwise known as Gen Z. Issues such as Cystic fibrosis, Racial discrimination, Sexuality, Islamophobia, Immigration, Cyberbullying, mental illness, school shootings and  

social media.

Cast

Series regulars
The first season has nineteen actors receiving star billing with fourteen of them returning from the previous series. Those in bold are new to the cast this season:

Amanda Arcuri as Lola Pacini (9 episodes)
Amir Bageria as Baaz Nahir (5 episodes)
Soma Bhatia as Goldi Nahir (5 episodes)
Jamie Bloch as Yael Baron (6 episodes)
Stefan Brogren as Archie "Snake" Simpson (3 episodes) 
Chelsea Clark as Esme Song (7 episodes)
Reiya Downs as Shaylynn "Shay" Powers (8 episodes)
Ana Golja as Zoë Rivas (8 episodes)
Nikki Gould as Grace Cardinal (10 episodes)
Ricardo Hoyos as Zigmund "Zig" Novak (10 episodes)
Ehren Kassam as Jonah Haak (9 episodes)
André Kim as Winston "Chewy" Chu (10 episodes)
Lyle Lettau as Tristan Milligan (9 episodes)
Spencer MacPherson as Hunter Hollingsworth (8 episodes)
Eric Osborne as Miles Hollingsworth III (10 episodes)
Dante Scott as Vijay Maraj (7 episodes)
Olivia Scriven as Maya Matlin (10 episodes)
Sara Waisglass as Francesca "Frankie" Hollingsworth (10 episodes)
Richard Walters as Deon "Tiny" Bell (9 episodes)

Supporting cast

Parents
Stephanie Moore as Mrs. Diana Hollingsworth (6 episodes)
Kate Hewlett as Mrs. Margaret Matlin (4 episodes)
John Ralston as Mr. Miles Hollingsworth II (2 episodes)
Cheri Maracle as Ms. Cardinal (2 episodes)Elle Downs as Mrs. Powers (1 episode)
Sterling Jarvis as Mr. Powers (1 episode)
America Olivo as Ms. Consuela Rivas (1 episode)

FacultyMichael Brown as Mr. Blake Mitchell (5 episodes)
Pay Chen as Mrs. Lin (3 episodes)Ashley Comeau as Ms. Badger (2 episodes)
Michael Kinney as Coach Darryl Armstrong (2 episodes)
Aisha Alfa as Ms. Grell (1 episode)
Tom Melissis as Mr. Dom Perino (1 episode)

Production
After the cancellation of Degrassi's 14-season run on TeenNick, Nickelodeon passed on the pitch for "Degrassi: Next Class". This reboot of the series was later picked up by Netflix and is considered a stand-alone series for a new generation—a new incarnation. This season was filmed along with season 2. The show was given a 20 episode order with the episodes being split into two seasons on Netflix and Family. Series stars' Amir Bageria and Stefan Brogren, confirmed this before the airing of episode 10. F2N and Degrassi are also advertising episode 10 as the season finale of season 1. Filming for the two seasons began in June 2015 and wrapped early September the same year.

Episodes

References

External links 
 List of Degrassi: Next Class episodes at IMDB.

Degrassi (franchise)
2016 Canadian television seasons